The river Drezna is a tributary of the Klyazma that passes through the Moscow Oblast. It gave its name to the town of Drezna, which built alongside it 1897.

References

Rivers of Moscow Oblast